Frank Vincent Gattuso Jr. (April 15, 1937 – September 13, 2017) was an American actor. During a five-decade career, Vincent often portrayed mobsters. He was a frequent collaborator of filmmaker Martin Scorsese, appearing as Salvy in Raging Bull (1980), Billy Batts in Goodfellas (1990), and Frank Marino in Casino (1995). On television, he played Phil Leotardo on the fifth and sixth seasons of the HBO crime drama The Sopranos (2004–2007). Vincent also voiced Salvatore Leone in the Grand Theft Auto video game series from 2001 to 2005.

Early life
Vincent, who was of Italian descent with roots in Sicily and Naples, was born in North Adams, Massachusetts, and raised in Jersey City, New Jersey. His father, Frank Vincent Gattuso Sr., was an iron worker and businessman. He had two brothers, Nick and Jimmy, and a half-sister, Fran.

Career
Skilled at the drums, piano and trumpet, Vincent originally aspired to a career in music. By day he was a studio musician who worked with many recording artists such as Paul Anka and Del Shannon. Vincent had his own jazz band, billed "Frank Vincent and the Aristocats," that played in the evenings. In 1969, Vincent's band needed a piano player to secure bookings and Vincent ended up hiring Joe Pesci to play guitar. As the popularity of lounge music waned, Vincent and Pesci turned to stand-up comedy, performing as "Vincent and Pesci" from 1970 to 1976. Their act coupled Abbott and Costello-inspired double act antics with Don Rickles-style insult comedy, which proved popular. During this time, both men developed a strong professional and personal friendship. 

Vincent and Pesci later landed parts in the low-budget gangster film The Death Collector (1976), where they were spotted by Robert De Niro. De Niro told Martin Scorsese about both Vincent and Pesci. Scorsese was impressed by their performances and hired Vincent to appear in a supporting role in Raging Bull (1980), in which he once again appeared with Pesci and co-starred with De Niro. Vincent appeared in small roles in two Spike Lee films: Do the Right Thing (1989) and Jungle Fever (1991). In the latter, he played the abusive patriarch of an Italian-American family.

One of his notable appearances in foreign films was as a supporting character in Juan José Jusid's Made in Argentina (1987), in which he played Vito, a wealthy Manhattan businessman who befriends the film's protagonist, a substance-abuse counselor who treated Vito's son, played by Luis Brandoni.

Vincent was often cast as a gangster. For example, in  Scorsese's film Goodfellas (1990), he played Billy Batts, a made man in the Gambino crime family; he also played a role in Scorsese's film Casino (1995) as Frank Marino (based on real-life gangster Frank Cullotta), the sidekick of Pesci's character.

In 1996, Vincent appeared in the music video for rap artist Nas' song "Street Dreams." In the television movie Gotti (1996), Vincent played Robert "D.B." DiBernardo, an associate of Mafia boss John Gotti's, whose life the film chronicled. In the HBO TV series The Sopranos, he had his most prominent role as Phil Leotardo, a ruthless New York City gangster who, as boss of the show's fictional Lupertazzi crime family, becomes the show's chief antagonist in the final season.

In 1999, he won the Italian American Entertainer of the Year Award. Another noted performance is his appearance in the film Remedy (2003).

In 2003, Vincent portrayed Danny Santini in the film This Thing of Ours, whose associate producer was Sonny Franzese, longtime mobster and underboss of the Colombo crime family, and whose director was Genovese crime family capo Danny Provenzano (grandnephew of Anthony Provenzano). Later that year, Vincent testified in court on the behalf of Provenzano at repeal sentences; Provenzano was serving a 10-year sentence for racketeering and other charges.

One of Vincent's lighter-hearted roles was in a British television commercial for Peugeot cars. In early 2005, he appeared on Irish television in a series of commercials for Irish bank Permanent TSB.

In video games, Vincent voiced the character of Mafia boss Salvatore Leone in the video game Grand Theft Auto III (2001). He later reprised the role in Grand Theft Auto: San Andreas (2004) and Grand Theft Auto: Liberty City Stories (2005).

In 2006 he released a book, A Guy's Guide to Being a Man's Man to positive reviews. His idol was Dean Martin. He has also released a line of hand-rolled cigars which have his picture prominently displayed on the band.

He played Lieutenant Marino in the independent film The Tested (2008), directed by Russell Costanzo. The following year, he made a cameo appearance alongside fellow Sopranos actor Steve Schirripa in the Stargate Atlantis episode "Vegas" (2009). The following year, he starred in Chicago Overcoat (2009) as the main protagonist.

In 2013, he starred in the hit IDW Publishing comic series Killogy created by Life of Agonys Alan Robert as the character Sally Sno Cones alongside Marky Ramone of The Ramones. The series was nominated at the Ghastly Awards for Best Mini-Series and won multiple Horror Comic Awards from the Horror News Network. In 2014, the comics were adapted into 3D-animation for the Killogy animated series, in which the cast of the original comic series contributed their voices.

A resident of Nutley, New Jersey, Vincent used his drumming skills in an impromptu performance at a township holiday concert.

Death and legacy
In early September 2017, Vincent suffered a heart attack. He underwent open heart surgery in New Jersey on September 13; however, he died shortly thereafter. Vincent was 80 years old. Director John Gallagher, who worked with Vincent on Street Hunter and The Deli, noted that the actor lied about his age to avoid discrimination, and therefore many sources listed his birth year as 1939.

Vincent's remains were cremated at a funeral home in Montclair, New Jersey, and a funeral service was held on September 16.

Filmography

Film

Television

Video games

Bibliography

References

External links

American Mafia.com

1937 births
2017 deaths
American male film actors
American male television actors
American male video game actors
American male voice actors
American male musicians
American people of Italian descent
Male actors from Massachusetts
Male actors from Jersey City, New Jersey
People from North Adams, Massachusetts
People from Nutley, New Jersey
American non-fiction writers
Writers from Massachusetts
Writers from New Jersey
20th-century American male actors
21st-century American male actors